The origins of the Eighty Years' War are complicated, and have been a source of disputes amongst historians for centuries.

The Habsburg Netherlands emerged as a result of the territorial expansion of the Burgundian State in the 14th and 15th centuries. Upon extinction of the Burgundian State in 1477/82, these lands were inherited by the House of Habsburg, whose Charles V became both King of Spain and Holy Roman Emperor. While conquering and incorporating the rest of what would become the "Seventeen Provinces" during the Guelders Wars (1502–1543), and seeking to forge and centralise these disparate regions into one political entity, Charles aspired to counter the Protestant Reformation and keep all his subjects obedient to the Catholic Church.

King Philip II of Spain, in his capacity as sovereign of Habsburg Netherlands, continued the anti-heresy and centralisation policies of his father Charles V. This caused growing resistance among the moderate nobility and population (both Catholic and dissenting) of the Netherlands. The Governor of the Habsburg Netherlands, Margaret of Parma, as well as authorities at lower levels, feared insurrection and made further concessions to the Calvinists, such as designating certain churches for Calvinist worship, but in December 1566 and early 1567 the first battles between Calvinist rebels and Habsburg governmental forces had taken place, commencing what would become known as the Eighty Years' War.

Background

Burgundian and Habsburg territorial expansion 

In a series of marriages and conquests, a succession of dukes of Burgundy expanded their original territory by adding to it a series of fiefdoms, including the Seventeen Provinces. Under the Burgundians (and their Habsburg successors), their holdings in the Low Countries were formally referred to as "De landen van herwaarts over" and in French "Les pays de par deça". Translated, the phrases mean "those lands around here" for the Dutch and "those lands around there" for the French.

The death of Burgundian duke Charles the Bold during the Battle of Nancy (5 January 1477) created an instant crisis for the Burgundian State. He had no male heirs, and the French and Swiss immediately invaded his lands, starting the War of the Burgundian Succession (1477–1482/93). The Duchy of Burgundy itself was lost to France in 1477, but the Burgundian Netherlands were still intact when Charles of Habsburg, heir to the Netherlands via his grandmother Mary, was born in Ghent in 1500. Charles was raised in the Netherlands and spoke fluent Dutch, French, and Spanish, along with some German. In 1506, he became lord of the Netherlands. In 1516, he inherited the kingdoms of Spain, which had become a worldwide empire with the Spanish colonization of the Americas, and in 1519, he inherited the Archduchy of Austria. Finally, he was elected Holy Roman Emperor in 1530. Although Frisia and Guelders offered prolonged resistance under Grutte Pier and Charles of Egmond respectively during the Guelders Wars (1502–1543), virtually all of the Netherlands had been incorporated into the Habsburg domains by the early 1540s.

Habsburg centralisation 

Part of the shifting balance of power in the late Middle Ages meant that besides the local nobility, many of the Dutch administrators by now were not traditional aristocrats but instead stemmed from non-noble families that had risen in status over previous centuries. By the 15th century, Brussels had thus become the de facto capital of the Seventeen Provinces. Dating back to the Middle Ages, the districts of the Netherlands, represented by its nobility and the wealthy city-dwelling merchants, still had a large measure of autonomy in appointing its administrators. The first meeting of the States General of the Netherlands occurred in 1464 during the reign of Philip the Good. On 11 February 1477, the States-General managed to force Mary of Burgundy to grant them the Great Privilege, a collection of rights and privileges that the Burgundian dukes and duchesses were supposed to respect. Charles V and Philip II set out to improve the management of the empire by increasing the authority of the central government in matters like law and taxes, a policy which caused suspicion among the nobility and the merchant class. An example of this is the takeover of power in the city of Utrecht in 1528, when Charles V supplanted the council of guild masters governing the city by his own stadtholder, who took over worldly powers in the whole province of Utrecht from the archbishop of Utrecht. Charles ordered the construction of the heavily fortified castle of Vredenburg for defence against the Duchy of Gelre and to control the citizens of Utrecht.

Under the governorship of Mary of Hungary (1531–1555), traditional power had largely been removed from both the stadtholders of the provinces and the high noblemen, who had been replaced by professional jurists in the Council of State.

Taxation 
Flanders had long been a very wealthy region, coveted by French kings. The other regions of the Netherlands had also grown wealthy and entrepreneurial. Charles V's empire had become a worldwide empire with large American and European territories. The latter were, however, distributed throughout Europe. Control and defense of these were hampered by the disparity of the territories and the huge length of the empire's borders. This large realm was almost continuously at war with its neighbors in its European heartlands, most notably against France in the Italian Wars and against the Ottoman Empire in the Mediterranean Sea. Other wars were fought against Protestant princes in Germany. The Dutch paid heavy taxes to fund these wars, but perceived them as unnecessary and sometimes downright harmful because they were directed against their most important trading partners.

Protestant Reformation 
During the 16th century, Protestantism rapidly gained ground in northern Europe. The Protestant Reformation led to the spread of Anabaptism of the Dutch reformer Menno Simons and the teachings of foreign Protestant leaders like Martin Luther and John Calvin. Dutch Protestants, after initial repression, were tolerated by local authorities. By the 1560s, the Protestant community had become a significant influence in the Netherlands, although still a minority. In a society dependent on trade, freedom and tolerance were considered essential. Nevertheless, Charles V, and from 1555 his successor Philip II, felt it was their duty to defeat Protestantism, which was considered a heresy by the Catholic Church and a threat to the stability of the whole hierarchical political system. On the other hand, the intensely moralistic Dutch Protestants insisted their theology, sincere piety, and humble lifestyle was morally superior to the luxurious habits and superficial religiosity of the ecclesiastical nobility. The harsh measures of suppression led to increasing grievances in the Netherlands, where the local governments had embarked on a course of peaceful coexistence. In the second half of the century, the situation escalated. Philip sent troops to crush the rebellion and make the Netherlands Catholic once again. Although failing in his attempts to introduce the Spanish Inquisition directly, the Inquisition of the Netherlands (existed until 1566) was nevertheless sufficiently severe and arbitrary to provoke fervent dislike.

Events and developments

Abdication of Charles V as Philip II becomes king (1555–1559) 

When Emperor Charles V began the gradual abdication of his several crowns in October 1555, his son Philip II took over as overlord of the conglomerate of duchies, counties and other feudal fiefs known as the Habsburg Netherlands. Technically they formed the Burgundian Circle that, under the Transaction of Augsburg of 1548 and Pragmatic Sanction of 1549, was to be transferred as a unit in hereditary succession in the House of Habsburg. At the time, this was a personal union of seventeen provinces with little in common beyond their overlord and a constitutional framework painfully assembled during the preceding reigns of Burgundian and Habsburg rulers. This framework divided power between city governments and local nobility, provincial States and royal stadtholders, and a central government of three collateral councils – the Council of State, Privy Council and Council of Finances – assisting (usually) a Regent, and the States-General of the Netherlands. The balance of power was heavily weighted toward the local and regional governments. Like his predecessors, Philip II had to ceremonially affirm those constitutional documents (like the Joyous Entry of Brabant) before his accession to the ducal throne. Beyond these constitutional guarantees, the balance of power between local and central government was guaranteed by the dependence of the central government on extraordinary levies (Beden) granted by the States-General when ordinary tax revenues fell short of the financing requirements of the central government (which occurred frequently, due to the many wars Charles waged).

In 1556 Charles passed on his throne to his son Philip II of Spain. Charles, despite his harsh actions, had been seen as a ruler sympathetic to the needs of the Netherlands. Philip, on the other hand, was raised in Spain and spoke neither Dutch nor French.

Though he was in the Netherlands in January, 1556, Philip II did not assume the reins of government in person, as he had to divide his attentions between England (where he was king-consort of Mary I of England), the Netherlands, and Spain. He therefore appointed a governor-general Emmanuel Philibert, Duke of Savoy, and subsequently from 1559 on, a Regent (his half-sister Margaret of Parma) to lead the central government on a day-to-day basis. As in the days of Charles V, these regents governed in close cooperation with Netherlandish grandees, such as William, Prince of Orange, Philip de Montmorency, Count of Hoorn, and Lamoral, Count of Egmont. But (other than Charles) he also introduced a number of Spanish councillors in the Council of State, foremost Antoine Perrenot de Granvelle, a cardinal from Franche-Comté. These people gained a preponderant influence in the Council, much to the chagrin of the Netherlandish old guard.

Increasing Spanish influence in the Netherlands (1559–1561) 

When Philip left for Spain in 1559 (as it turned out, permanently) the central government therefore already experienced political strains, and those were exacerbated by the question of religious policy. Like his father, Philip was a fervent enemy of the Protestant teachings of Martin Luther, John Calvin, and the Anabaptists. Charles had legally defined heresy as "treason against God" (or French lèse-majesté divine) an "exceptional crime" that was outside the purview of normal legal procedures as laid down in the Netherlandish legal privileges. He therefore outlawed heresy in special placards that made it a capital offence, to be prosecuted by a Netherlandish version of the Inquisition. Between 1523 and 1566, more than 1,300 people were executed as heretics, far more relative to the overall population than, for instance, in France. Towards the end of Charles' reign enforcement had reportedly become lax. Philip, however, insisted on rigorous enforcement, which caused widespread unrest. 

The anti-Protestant placards, and the policy of repression of heresy in general, were highly unpopular, not just with prospective adherents of the Protestant faiths, but also with the Catholic population and the local governments, who considered it an intrusion on their prerogatives. Towards the end of Charles' reign, enforcement had therefore become quite lax. Philip, however, insisted on rigorous enforcement and this caused more and more popular unrest. In the province of Holland, for instance, there were riots in the late 1550s during which the mob freed some condemned persons before their execution.

To support and strengthen the attempts at Counter-Reformation, issuing from the Council of Trent, Philip launched a wholesale organizational reform of the Catholic Church in the Netherlands in 1559 (with Papal approval). This amounted to the introduction of fourteen new dioceses instead of the old three. This new hierarchy was to be headed by Granvelle as archbishop of the new archdiocese of Mechelen. The reform was especially unpopular with the old church hierarchy as the new dioceses were to be financed by transferring a number of rich abbeys that were traditionally in the gift of the high aristocracy. The new bishops were to take the lead in the enforcement of the anti-heresy placards and to intensify the Inquisition.

In an effort to build a stable and trustworthy government of the Netherlands, Philip appointed his half-sister Margaret of Parma as governor. He continued the policy of his father of appointing members of the high nobility of the Netherlands to the Raad van State (Council of State), the governing body of the seventeen provinces that advised the governor. He made his confidant Antoine Perrenot de Granvelle head of the council. However, in 1558 the States of the provinces and the States-General of the Netherlands already started to contradict Philip's wishes by objecting to his tax proposals. They also demanded, with eventual success, the withdrawal of Spanish troops, which had been left by Philip to guard the Southern Netherlands' borders with France, but which they saw as a threat to their own independence (1559–1561).

League of Netherlandish nobles against Granvelle (1561–1564) 

Subsequent reforms met with much opposition, which was mainly directed at Granvelle. The core of the League was formed by the triumvirate of Lamoral, Count of Egmont, Philip de Montmorency, Count of Horne, and William "the Silent", Prince of Orange, later joined by Berghes, Montigny, Megen, Mansfeld, Hoogstraten,  and Hachicourt. All ten Ligueurs were knights in the Order of the Golden Fleece, and almost all of them were stadtholders. High noblemen who opposed the League, and thus more or less backed Granvelle, were inter alia Philippe III de Croÿ (Aarschot), William de Croÿ, Marquess of Renty, Charles de Berlaymont and Jean de Ligne, Duke of Arenberg.

Petitions to King Philip by the high nobility went unanswered. Some of the most influential nobles, including Lamoral, Count of Egmont, Philip de Montmorency, Count of Hoorn, and William the Silent, withdrew from the Council of State until Philip recalled Granvelle.

Granvelle's perceived aggrandizement helped focus the opposition against him. The grandees under the leadership of Orange engineered his recall in 1564. Emboldened by this success Orange intensified his attempts to obtain religious toleration. He persuaded Margaret and the Council to ask for a moderation of the placards against heresy. Philip delayed his response, however, and in the meantime the opposition against his religious policies gained more widespread support. 

In late 1564, the nobles noticed the growing power of the reformation and urged Philip to devise realistic measures to prevent violence. Philip answered that sterner measures were the only answer. Subsequently, Egmont, Horne, and Orange withdrew once more from the council, and Bergen and Meghem resigned their Stadholdership. During the same period, the religious protests were increasing despite increased oppression.

Growing religious tensions (1564–1566) 

After the recall of Granvelle, Orange persuaded Margaret and the council to ask for a moderation of the placards against heresy. Philip delayed his response, and in this interval, the opposition to his religious policies gained more widespread support. Philip finally rejected the request for moderation in his Letters from the Segovia Woods of October 1565. In response, a group of members of the lesser nobility, among whom were Louis of Nassau, a younger brother of Orange, and the brother's John and Philip of St. Aldegonde, prepared a petition for Philip that sought the abolition of the Inquisition. This Compromise of Nobles was supported by about 400 nobles, both Catholic and Protestant, and was presented to Margaret on 5 April 1566. Impressed by the massive support for the compromise, she suspended the placards, awaiting Philip's final ruling.

One of Margaret's courtiers, Count Berlaymont, called the presentation of this petition an act of "beggars" (French "gueux"), a name then taken up by the petitioners themselves (they called themselves the Geuzen). The petition was sent on to Philip for a final verdict.

Beeldenstorm and outbreak of war

See also 
 Aftermath of the Eighty Years' War
 Historiography of the Eighty Years' War

Notes

References

Bibliography 
 
 
 
 
 
 
  [2001] paperback
  paperback
 

Eighty Years' War
Reformation in the Netherlands
 
16th century in Spain
16th-century conflicts
Wars involving Spain
Wars involving the Netherlands